Sajjan Jindal (born 5 December 1959) is an Indian billionaire industrialist. He is the chairman and managing director of JSW Group of companies; diversified in steel, mining, energy, sports, infrastructure and, software business.

For 2021–22, he served as the chairman of World Steel Association. He was replaced by POSCO's Jeong-Woo Choi.

Early life and education 
He is one of the sons of Indian businessman and parliamentarian, Om Prakash Jindal. His youngest brother, Naveen, is a former Member of Parliament of India from the Indian National Congress party and also leading Jindal Steel and Power.

According to Forbes, Jindal family led by Savitri Jindal is worth US$14.5 billion, as of 2021.

Sajjan Jindal holds a bachelor's degree in mechanical engineering from the Ramaiah Institute of Technology, Bangalore.

Career
In 1982, he joined the OP Jindal Group as a freshly graduated mechanical engineer, and within a year he moved to Mumbai to look after the western region operations. In 1983–1984, Jindal's father, Om Prakash Jindal put him to the test by ordering him to turn around operations at two facilities near Mumbai.

He promoted Jindal Iron and Steel Company Limited. (JISCO), for manufacturing of Cold Rolled and Galvanized Sheet Products in 1989. He promoted Jindal Vijaynagar Steel Limited (JVSL), JSW Energy Limited (JSWEL), Jindal Praxair Oxygen Limited. (JPOCL) and Vijaynagar Minerals Private Limited. (VMPL) to ensure complete integration of the manufacturing progress in 1995. In 2005, his steel companies, JISCO, and JVSL, were merged to form JSW Steel, and a holdings group of the same name.

Even before the death of OP Jindal in a helicopter accident in 2005, the group's patriarch established a "division of business" framework. First, he gave Prithviraj, Sajjan, Ratan, and Naveen Jindal equal shares of the existing OP Jindal Group he had built up over the years. Then, Jindal Senior ensured that each of his sons had a cross-holding in the businesses that the brothers were owning individually.

Jindal was an instrumental figure in establishing Indian Steel Association in the 2014

Business
The JSW Group is a multi business conglomerate worth US$22 billion. The group's companies are:
 JSW Steel
 JSW Energy
 JSW Holdings
 JSW Infrastructure
 Vijaynagar Minerals
 Jindal Praxair Oxygen Company
 JSoft Solutions
 JSW Building Systems
 JSW Sports
 JSW Cement
 JSW Severfield Structures

Philanthropy 

 Sajjan Jindal Steel Professor Chair, Center of Excellence in Steel Technology (CoEST), Indian Institute of Technology Bombay.

Awards and recognition

 June 2009, Willy Korf/Ken Iverson Steel Vision Award for his contribution to the steel industry.
 2014 "National Metallurgist Award: Industry” instituted by the Ministry of Steel, Government of India.
 2018 CEO of the Year award by Business Standard.
 IIM-JRD Tata Award 2017 for Excellence in Corporate Leadership in Metallurgical industry.
 Best CEO award 2019 by Business Today Magazine.
 Ernst & Young Entrepreneur of the Year Award 2022.

Personal life 

Jindal is married to Sangita Jindal, who is Chairperson of JSW Foundation. Together, the couple has two daughters, Tarini and Tanvi, and a son, Parth.

References

External links
 JSW Group official website

Living people
Bangalore University alumni
Businesspeople from Haryana
1959 births
People from Hisar (city)
JSW Group
Jindal family
Indian football chairmen and investors
Indian Premier League franchise owners